Humphrey Ewing Crum-Ewing (16 July 1802 – 3 July 1887) was a Scottish Liberal politician who sat in the House of Commons from 1857 to 1874.

Crum-Ewing was born Humphrey Crum, the son of Alexander Crum of Thornliebank, Renfrewshire and his wife Jane Maclae, daughter of Walter Ewing Maclae of Cathkin. His brother was the chemist Walter Crum.

He was educated at Glasgow College. In 1853, he assumed the name of Ewing in accordance with the will of his uncle James Ewing of Strathleven. He was the owner of properties in the West Indies, chairman of the West Indian Association of Glasgow and a director of the Colonial Company of London.  He was a Deputy Lieutenant of Dumbartonshire and J.P. for Dumbartonshire, Argyllshire, Lanarkarkshire, and Renfrewshire.

Crum-Ewing stood unsuccessfully for Paisley in April 1857, but was elected Member of Parliament for Paisley in November 1857. He held the seat until 1874. He was Lord Lieutenant of Dumbartonshire from 23 February 1874 until his death in 1887 at the age of 84.
 
Crum-Ewing married Helen Dick, daughter of the Rev. John Dick of Glasgow in 1826.

References

External links 
 

1802 births
1887 deaths
Scottish Liberal Party MPs
Members of the Parliament of the United Kingdom for Scottish constituencies
UK MPs 1857–1859
UK MPs 1859–1865
UK MPs 1865–1868
UK MPs 1868–1874
Lord-Lieutenants of Dunbartonshire